Richard Fahey is a racehorse trainer, based in Malton, North Yorkshire.  He has saddled over 60 Group race and Listed winners in the UK, Ireland, France and Canada. Group 1 winners include Perfect Power in the 2022 Commonwealth Cup and 2021 Prix Morny, and the Middle Park Stakes, Sands Of Mali in the 2018 British Champions Sprint Stakes and Ribchester in the 2017 Group 1 Queen Anne Stakes at Royal Ascot. Garswood in the 2014 Prix Maurice de Gheest, Mayson in the 2012 Group 1 July Cup at Newmarket and Wootton Bassett in the 2010 Group 1 Prix Jean-Luc Lagardère at Longchamp. In 2015 Fahey equalled the record for the most calendar wins with 235.  He ended 2017 with prize money of over £4.2m and 2018 he finished the season with 190 winners. He has trained over 3,000 winners both over the jumps and on the flat.

Career

Richard Fahey has built his training career on the back of a successful stint as a jockey. He chalked-up just over 100 winners, under both codes, in ten years in the saddle, the highlight of which was sharing the conditional jockeys’ title in the 1988–89 season.

From starting out, in the summer of 1993, from Manor Farm, Butterwick, near Malton, with a modest string which barely reached double-figures, Fahey has never looked back.

In 2002, Fahey got his name on the Royal Ascot roll of honour courtesy of Superior Premium – a colt he bought as a yearling for 2,800gns- who clinched a 20–1 triumph in the Cork And Orrery Stakes under Johnny Murtagh.

2005 saw Fahey make the move to Musley Bank Stables, Malton, his current base and in 2006 he went through the £1 million prize money barrier.

In 2008 he saddled more than 100 winners for the first time, prize money was up to £1.2 million.

In 2010, Fahey burst through the £2 million prize money barrier with 181 winners in Britain. He also saddled his first Group One winner with Wootton Bassett in the 2010 Group 1 Prix Jean-Luc Lagardère at Longchamp.

2014 saw Fahey training his first winner at the Dubai World Cup; Gabrial for owner Dr Marwan Koukash. He trained 192 winners and prize money was over £2.8 million. In the British Flat Turf Trainers Championship Fahey finished third numerically, and fourth over-all. Baccarat also won the Wokingham Stakes at Royal Ascot and Fahey trained another Group One winner when Garswood won the Prix Maurice de Gheest

In 2015, Fahey equalled the record for most flat winners trained in a calendar year – 235. The season started with success for owner Dr Marwan Koukash and jockey Tony Hamilton to win the £100,000 Lincoln Handicap at Doncaster Racecourse with former Group 1 contender, Gabrial.  The trio had previously enjoyed success in the 2012 renewal of the annual flat racing curtain raiser, with Brae Hill. Dr Koukash also owned Fahey's 2000th winner, Rene Mathis bought up the milestone at Goodwood in August. There was Group 2 success with Birchwood in the Superlative Stakes and Ribchester in the Mill Reef Stakes for Godolphin. Donjuan Triumphant won the Criterium De Maisons-Laffitte for Middleham Park Racing. Eastern Impact won the Group 3 Bengough Stakes at Ascot and there were numerous big Saturday winners. Don't Touch won the Ayr Gold Cup, Third Time Lucky the Cambridgeshire, Lathom the Weatherbys Super Sprint and Mr Lupton the Weatherbys Hamilton £300,000 2-Y-O Stakes.

In 2016, Fahey trained 198 winners and prize money was over £3m. He trained the Godolphin owned Ribchester to win the Jersey Stakes at Royal Ascot and followed that Group 3 success with a Group 1 win in Deauville in the Prix Jacques Le Marois. He also trained Queen Kindly (a daughter of Frankel) to Group 2 success in the Lowther Stakes at York.

Ribchester continued his Group 1 success in 2017 with victory in the Lockinge at Newbury, the Prix du Moulin and he broke the track record in the Queen Anne at Royal Ascot. Fahey ended the year with 200 winners and prize money was over £4.2m. He won the Gimcrack Stakes for the first time with Sands Of Mali. Bengali Boys won the Wetherby Super Sprint and Darkanna the Redcar Trophy.

In 2018 he sent out 190 winners – there was Group 3 success for Mr Lupton in the Trophy Stakes at Newbury. Forest Ranger picked up the Group 2 Huxley Stakes and Sands Of Mali picked up the full bag with Group 3 success in the Prix Sigy, the Group 2 Sandy Lane and  Group 1 success in the Champion Sprint Stakes at Ascot.

In the space of less than 20 years, Fahey has become one of the country's leading trainers with more than 200 horses on his books.

For 12 years, Paul Hanagan was the stable's number one jockey, twice winning the British flat jockey championship, before leaving to take up a position as retained rider with Sheikh Hamdan Al Maktoum. Hanagan returned to Musley Bank in 2017 and Oisin Orr became stable jockey in June 2022. Other Jockeys used include Tony Hamilton, Jack Garritty, Dave Nolan, Connor Murtagh.

Major wins
 Great Britain
 Commonwealth Cup - Perfect Power (2022)
 Diamond Jubilee Stakes – Superior Premium (2000)
 July Cup – Mayson (2012)
 Lockinge Stakes – Ribchester (2017)
 Middle Park Stakes - Perfect Power (2021)
 Queen Anne Stakes – Ribchester (2017)
 British Champions Sprint Stakes – Sands Of Mali (2018)

 France
 Prix de l'Abbaye de Longchamp - The Platinum Queen (2022)
 Prix du Moulin – Ribchester (2017)
 Prix Jacques Le Marois – Ribchester (2016)
 Prix Jean-Luc Lagardère – Wootton Bassett (2010)
 Prix Maurice de Gheest – Garswood (2014)
 Prix Morny – Perfect Power (2021)

 Ireland
 Punchestown Gold Cup – Noyan (1997)

References

External links 
 Richard Fahey official website

Irish racehorse trainers
Living people
Year of birth missing (living people)